The Subcommittee on Security and Defence (SEDE) is a subcommittee of the Committee on Foreign Affairs of the European Parliament. It is responsible for European security and defence policy, including institutions, capabilities and operations, as well as developing relations with strategic partners and third countries. During the Ninth European Parliament (2019–2024), the committee has 30 members and is chaired by Nathalie Loiseau from France.

Members
As of 12 April 2022, the 30 members of the subcommittee are:

Chairpersons

References

External links
Official webpage 

Security
Subcommittees